František Valošek (born 12 July 1937) is a Czech former football player who competed in the 1964 Summer Olympics. He was born in Frýdek-Místek, and played club football in the 1950s and '60s for Baník Ostrava, for whom he scored 54 goals in 151 appearances.

References

External links
 
 
 

1937 births
Living people
Czechoslovak footballers
Czechoslovakia international footballers
Olympic footballers of Czechoslovakia
Olympic silver medalists for Czechoslovakia
Olympic medalists in football
Footballers at the 1964 Summer Olympics
Medalists at the 1964 Summer Olympics
FC Baník Ostrava players
People from Frýdek-Místek
Association football forwards
Czech footballers
Sportspeople from the Moravian-Silesian Region